The 2009 United Nations Security Council election was held on 15 October 2009 during the 64th session of the United Nations General Assembly, held at United Nations Headquarters in New York City. The election was for five non-permanent seats on the UN Security Council to serve two-year mandates commencing on 1 January 2010.

In accordance with the Security Council's rotation rules, whereby the ten non-permanent UNSC seats rotate among the various regional blocs into which UN member states traditionally divide themselves for voting and representation purposes, the five available seats were allocated as follows:

Two for Africa (previously held by Burkina Faso and Libya)
One for Asia (previously held by Vietnam)
One for Eastern Europe (previously held by Croatia)
One for Latin America and the Caribbean (previously held by Costa Rica)

Nigeria was expected to run unopposed for a 2010–11 seat, but unexpectedly faced competition from Sierra Leone. Nigeria has already served thrice in the UNSC, while Sierra Leone served only once. Sierra Leone did not contest the seat, however. Instead, Gabon ran for the second seat.

Bosnia and Herzegovina was the only candidate country for the Eastern European group seat, as Poland withdrew its candidacy in order to give a strong support to the new Bosnian statehood. Poland then gave its support to Bosnia and Herzegovina and invited "all the countries which have already given their support to Polish candidacy, to back-up Bosnia and Herzegovina becoming a member of the UN Security Council." Serbia announced its plans to run for the Eastern Europe seat.

As Libya's term was ending, the new Arab representative would come from the Asian Group. One of the eleven Arab League member states in Asia would therefore succeed to Vietnam's seat in this election. Lebanon announced its intention to obtain this seat.

Brazil sought to replace Costa Rica.

This year, Bosnia and Herzegovina was elected to the Council for the first time.

Elected members
The five elected members after the 2009 elections were:
Africa: Gabon and Nigeria replaced Burkina Faso and Libya
Asia: Lebanon replaced Vietnam
Eastern Europe: Bosnia and Herzegovina replaced Croatia
GRULAC: Brazil replaced Costa Rica

Results
All the candidates ran unopposed, so the election was expected to be a non-event. Nigeria got 186 votes, Gabon 184, Bosnia 183, Brazil 182 and Lebanon 180.

Official results were:
Group A — African and Asian States (three to be elected)

Group B — Eastern European States (one to be elected)

Group C — Latin American and Caribbean States (one to be elected)

See also

List of members of the United Nations Security Council
Brazil and the United Nations
List of United Nations resolutions relating to Lebanon

References

External links 
General Assembly 64th session 20th plenary meeting (official records)
GA/10871 Department of Public Information
UN News Centre

2009 in international relations
2009
2009 elections
Non-partisan elections
2009 in New York City
October 2009 events